Akçasu can refer to:

 Akçasu, Devrek
 Akçasu, İskilip
 Akçasu, Söğüt